Paul Frederick Stanton (born June 22, 1967) is an American former professional ice hockey player.

Career
Drafted by the Pittsburgh Penguins in 1985 as a high school senior, Paul chose to play for the University of Wisconsin–Madison, and was named an NCAA West All-American in 1988.

He played his first NHL game in the 1991 season for the Penguins, and was a member of the Stanley Cup winning team in 1991 and 1992. He was later traded to the Boston Bruins and then to the New York Islanders, playing parts of those seasons with each team's respective minor league teams.

In 1995 and 1996 he played 13 matches for Team USA at the Ice Hockey World Championships, winning the bronze medal.

In 1996 he left the NHL for Europe, playing in the DEL for the Adler Mannheim. With Mannheim he won the German championships in  1997, 1998 and 1999. Prior to the 2000–01 season, he became a member of the Nürnberg Ice Tigers until 2002, when he started for the Frankfurt Lions.

His most recent team has been IF Redhawks Malmö of the Swedish Elitserien.

Paul Stanton currently resides in Naples, Florida and now serves as an assistant coach for the Florida Gulf Coast University Hockey Team.

Career statistics

Awards and honors

References

External links

1967 births
Living people
Adler Mannheim players
American men's ice hockey defensemen
Boston Bruins players
Denver Grizzlies players
Florida Gulf Coast Eagles
Frankfurt Lions players
Malmö Redhawks players
Muskegon Fury players
New York Islanders players
Nürnberg Ice Tigers players
Pittsburgh Penguins players
Pittsburgh Penguins draft picks
Providence Bruins players
Stanley Cup champions
Wisconsin Badgers men's ice hockey players
Ice hockey people from Boston
AHCA Division I men's ice hockey All-Americans